Bulgaria competed at the 1980 Winter Olympics in Lake Placid, United States.

Medalists

Lebanov was the first Bulgarian to win a Winter Olympics Medal.

Alpine skiing

Men

Biathlon

Men

 1 A penalty loop of 150 metres had to be skied per missed target.
 2 One minute added per close miss (a hit in the outer ring), two minutes added per complete miss.

Cross-country skiing

Men

References
Official Olympic Reports
International Olympic Committee results database
 Olympic Winter Games 1980, full results by sports-reference.com

Nations at the 1980 Winter Olympics
1980
1980 in Bulgarian sport